Velebit is a mountain range in Croatia.

Velebit may also refer to:
 National Park Sjeverni Velebit, located in the northern part of the Velebit mountain range
 Vladimir Velebit (1907–2004), Yugoslav communist 
 Velebit, Kanjiža, a village in Serbia
 , Croatian submarine in service from 1996 to 2001.
 Velebit Pumped Storage Power Plant

See also
 
 
 Velebites, cephalopod genus
 Velvet (disambiguation)